"The Five" is the fourth episode of The Vampire Diaries's fourth season, premiering November 1, 2012 on The CW.

Plot
Klaus and Rebekah Mikaelson tell Stefan Salvatore about The Five, a group of vampire hunters of whom they have known for 900 years. Rebekah had fallen in love with one of The Five, Alexander. However, Alexander betrays her love and daggers Rebekah. The Five then attempt to kill the rest of the Originals but their plan is thwarted when the dagger dipped into the white oak ash does not work on Klaus as a result of his werewolf side and Klaus kills Alexander. The tattoos which mark the bodies of The Five are a map to a way of ridding the world of all vampires. Stefan later convinces Rebekah to reveal the missing piece of the map- Alexander's engraved sword, which Rebekah had buried with him. Klaus convinces Stefan to help him as the map may lead them to a cure for vampirism. Stefan agrees, thinking of Elena's struggle to adapt. A guilty Stefan apologizes to Rebekah just before her brother daggers her.

Bonnie Bennett, Elena Gibert, and Damon visit the college where Bonnie's grandmother used to teach, at which there is a Halloween party. As Professor Atticus Shane helps Bonnie, Damon shows Elena how to feed properly. At first, Elena lets her emotions get in the way of her feeding but later at the Halloween party, she finds that preying on wrong-doers lessens her guilt. Elena, intoxicated with the human blood, dances with Damon as they both drink. However, when she sees Bonnie looking on in horror, Elena snaps out of the haze and feels guilty. They then go home to Mystic Falls where she apologizes to Damon for lashing out at him after the party, and admits that deep down she believes Damon's way of living as vampire is the right way. However, Elena expresses that she hates that feeling and Damon assumes she is saying she doesn't want to be like him even though she feels this way, but before Elena can respond Stefan shows up and Damon leaves.

Connor Jordan, meanwhile, has been kept prisoner by Klaus. Klaus enlists Jeremy's help in drawing the tattoos as he is the only one with the ability to see them. However, the tattoos - and by extension, the map - are incomplete. The tattoos spread each time Connor kills a vampire, therefore meaning that there are more vampiric deaths to occur before the map can be completed. After Jeremy finishes the drawing, Klaus leaves a hybrid, Nate, to look after Connor. Nate is killed by Connor when he manages to escape using an earring ripped from Nate's ear. The episode ends with Connor arriving in Professor Shane's office at Whitmore College where it is seen that Shane sent Connor to Mystic Falls to kill vampires.

Reception

Ratings 
When the episode aired on November 1, 2012, the episode was viewed by 3.27 million American viewers and garnered a 1.5 rating in the 18-49 demographic up 15% from the previous week.

References

External links 
 Recap from Official Website

2012 American television episodes
The Vampire Diaries (season 4) episodes